This is a list of farm and industrial tractors produced by Allis-Chalmers Corporation, as well as tractors that were produced by other manufacturers and then sold under the Allis-Chalmers brand name.

For clarity, tractors are listed by series and separated by major models as needed.

Tractors (wheeled)

Lawn/garden tractor series
B-Series
B-1
B-7 (prototype only 3 built)
B-10 (early, 9 hp)
Big Ten
B-10 (late, 10 hp)
B-12
B-110
B-112
B-206
B-207
B-208
B-208S
B-210
B-212
HB-112
HB-212
Numbered series
Homesteader
310
310D
312
312D
312H
314H
410S
414S
416S
416H
608 LTD
610
611 LT
614
616
620
710
712
712S
714
716
718H
720
T-811
808 GT
810 GT
816 GT
912
914
916
917
919
920
Allis-Chalmers 4W series

4W-220 (1981-1984) (articulated)
4W-305 (1981-1985) (articulated)

Allis-Chalmers 100 series
160 (1969-1973): Also known as One-Sixty; imported from Renault (France)
170 (1967-1973): Also known as One-Seventy
175 (1970-1980)
180 (1967-1973): Also known as One-Eighty
185 (1970-1981)
190 (1964-1973): Also known as One-Ninety
190XT
200 (1972-1975)
210
220 (1969-1973): Also known as Two-Twenty
440 (1972-1976): Built by Steiger

Allis-Chalmers 5000 series
5015 (1982-1985): Imported from Toyosha (Japan)
5020 (1977-1985): Imported from Toyosha (Japan)
5030 (1978-1985): Imported from Toyosha (Japan)
5040 (1975-1980): Imported from UTB (Romania)
5045 (1981): Imported from Fiat (Italy)
5050 (1976-1983): Imported from Fiat (Italy)

Allis-Chalmers 6000 series
6040 (1974): Imported from Renault (France)
6060 (1980-1984)
6070 (1984-1985)
6080 (1980-1985)
6140 (1982-1985): Imported from Toyosha (Japan)

Allis-Chalmers 7000 series
7000 (1975-1979)
7010 (1979-1981)
7020 (1977-1981)
7030 (1973-1974)
7040 (1974-1977)
7045 (1977-1981)
7050 (1973-1974)
7060 (1974-1981)
7080 (1974-1981)
7580 4WD (1976-1981) (articulated)

Allis-Chalmers 8000 series
8010 (1981-1985)
8030 (1981-1985)
8050 (1981-1985)
8070 (1981-1985)
8550 (1977-1981)

Allis-Chalmers B series
Model B (1937-1957)
Model IB (1945-1958)

Allis-Chalmers C series
Model C (1940-1950)
Model CA (1950-1958)

Allis-Chalmers D series
Model D10 (1959-1968; Series I, II and III)
Model D12 (1959-1968; Series I, II and III)
Model D14 (1957-1960)
Model D15 (1960-1968; Series I and II)
Model D17 (1957-1967; Series I, II, III and IV)
Model D19 (1961-1964)
Model D21 (1963-1969; Series I and II)

Allis-Chalmers I series: Industrial tractors
Model I40 (1964-1966)
Model I60 (1965-1966)
Model I400 (1966-1968)
Model I600 (1966-1968)

Allis-Chalmers Model 6-12 (1918–1923)
Allis-Chalmers Model 10-10 (1914–1923)
Allis-Chalmers Model A (1936–1942)
Allis-Chalmers Model E (1918–1936): Also known as Model 15-30, 18-30, 20-35, 25-40, 30-60 (The 30-60 is a rare variation of the 25-40 also known as the "Thresherman's Special")
Allis-Chalmers Model ED40 (1964):200 imported from Allis-Chalmers International (United Kingdom Essendine factory) through Canadian dealerships.
Allis-Chalmers Model G (1948–1955)
Allis-Chalmers Model L (1920–1927): Also known as Model 12-20, 15-25
Allis-Chalmers Model T16 "Sugar Babe"
Allis-Chalmers U Series
Model U (1929-1952): Also known as United
Model UC (1930-1953): Also known as All-Crop or Cultivator
Model UI (1937-1947)

Allis-Chalmers W series
Model WC (1933-1948)
Model WD (1948-1953)
Model WD45 (1953-1957)
Model WF (1937-1951)
Model RC (1938-1941)

After the second world war Allis Chalmers operated factories in the United Kingdom at Totton (to 1949) in Totton Hampshire and Essendine in Rutland. Formerly the Minneapolis-Moline factory.

Model EB (1950-1955) British built model B with a straight front axle. EB serial numbers from Essendine works began at EB-4001. Some 2000 were assembled at the Totton, Southampton facility between 1947/9 from imported CKD kits but using US serial numbers locally stamped with an additional E prefix. Theoretically there may be duplication of serial numbers with later English production tractors.

Model D270 (1954-1957)
Model D272 (1957-1960)
Model ED40 (1960-1968)

Tractors (tracked)

Allis-Chalmers HD series
Model H3 (1960-1968)
Model HD3 (1942)
Model HD3 (1960-1968)
Model HD4 (1965-1969?)
Model HD5 (1946-1955)
Model HD6 (1955-1974)
Model HD7 (1940-1950)
Model HD9 (1950-1955)
Model HD10 (1940-1950)
Model HD11 (1955-1975?)
Model HD14 (1939-1947)
Model HD15 (1950-1955)
Model HD16 (1955-1975?)
Model HD19 (1947-1950)
Model HD20 (1951-1954)
Model HD21 (1954-1975)
Model HD31
Model HD41 (1969-1974)

Allis-Chalmers K series
Model K (1929-1941) formerly Monarch 35
Model KO (1934-1943)

Allis-Chalmers L series
Model L (1931-1942)
Model LD (1939)
Model LO (1934)

Allis-Chalmers Model M (1932–1942)
Allis-Chalmers Monarch Series: formerly built by Monarch Tractor Corporation
Monarch Model F (1926-1931)
Monarch Model G (1926-1927)
Monarch Model H (1927-1931)

Allis-Chalmers S series
Model S (1937-1942)
Model SO (1937-1942)

Harvesters

Gleaner C
Gleaner E
Gleaner E-III
Gleaner K
Gleaner L2
Gleaner A85

All-Crop harvesters

All-Crop 40
All-Crop 60
All-Crop 66
All-Crop 72
All-Crop 90
All-Crop 100

Military production
M1 tractor medium model HD7W
M1 tractor heavy model HD10W
M4 Tractor high speed 18-Ton artillery tractor manufactured from 1943.
M6 Tractor high speed 38-Ton (artillery tractor)
M7 Snow Tractor
M19 snow trailer, 1-Ton
M50 Ontos - a light anti-tank vehicle, 297 units produced from 1955 to 1957.

Other related equipment

Allis-Chalmers Speed Patrol: Road grading and maintenance tractors
Speed Patrol Model H (1932-1933)
Speed Patrol Model 42 (1933-1940)
Speed Patrol Model 54 (1934-1940)

Prototype models

Allis-Chalmers Fuel Cell Tractor (1959)
Allis-Chalmers Model D (ca. 1944-1945): Not related to later production D Series
Allis-Chalmers Model F (ca. 1947)
Allis-Chalmers Model H (ca. 1942-1945): Four-wheel drive tractor, based on Bonham Power Horse design

See also
 List of Allis-Chalmers engines

References

Swinford, Norm (1994). Allis-Chalmers Farm Equipment 1914-1985. 
Dean, Terry (2000). Allis-Chalmers Farm Tractors and Crawlers Data Book. 

Allis-Chalmers
Allis-Chalmers Manufacturing Company
Agriculture-related lists